Grant Haley (born January 6, 1996) is an American football cornerback who is a free agent. He played college football at Penn State. Haley is best known for returning the blocked field goal against the then undefeated Ohio State Buckeyes for a game-winning touchdown in 2016.

Professional career

New York Giants
Following the 2018 NFL Draft, Haley was signed by the New York Giants as an undrafted free agent. He saw snaps at cornerback and safety in his time with the Giants. He was waived on September 1, 2018 and was signed to the practice squad the next day. On October 16, 2018, he was signed to the active roster. Haley ended the 2018 season ranked as the 4th best rookie cornerback ranked by Pro Football Focus.

On September 5, 2020, Haley was waived by the Giants.

New Orleans Saints
On September 19, 2020, Haley was signed to the New Orleans Saints' practice squad. He was promoted to the active roster on December 5, 2020, but his contract was disapproved by the NFL on December 9, and he reverted to the practice squad. He was elevated to the active roster on January 2, 2021, for the team's week 17 game against the Carolina Panthers, and reverted to the practice squad after the game. During the game, Haley recorded his first career interception off a pass thrown by Teddy Bridgewater in the 33–7 win. On January 18, 2021, Haley signed a reserve/futures contract with the Saints.

On August 31, 2021, Haley was waived by the Saints.

Los Angeles Rams
On October 20, 2021, Haley was signed to the Los Angeles Rams practice squad. He was promoted to the active roster on January 8, 2022. Haley won the Super Bowl when the Rams defeated the Cincinnati Bengals.

On August 30, 2022, Haley was waived by the Rams and signed to the practice squad the next day. He was promoted to the active roster on September 24, 2022. He was placed on injured reserve on October 18, 2022.

References

External links
Penn State Nittany Lions bio
New York Giants bio

1996 births
Living people
American football cornerbacks
Los Angeles Rams players
The Lovett School alumni
New Orleans Saints players
New York Giants players
Penn State Nittany Lions football players
Players of American football from Atlanta